The International Supervisor for Brčko is the representative of the international community in the Brčko District.

As of 2021 all of the International Supervisors have been from the United States, while their principal deputies have been from European Union countries. International Supervisor for Brčko serves the role of Principal Deputy High Representative for Bosnia and Herzegovina.

Suspension of the Office of the International Supervisor
Following the Peace Implementation Council meeting on 23 May 2012, it was decided to suspend, not terminate, the mandate of Brčko International Supervisor. Brčko Arbitral Tribunal, together with the suspended Brčko Supervision, will still continue to exist.

List of International Supervisors

See also
 Brčko
 Brčko District
 List of mayors of Brčko
 High Representative for Bosnia and Herzegovina

Notes

External links
World Statesmen - Brčko

Politics of Bosnia and Herzegovina
Government of Bosnia and Herzegovina
1997 establishments in Bosnia and Herzegovina
Brčko District
Bosnia and Herzegovina–United States relations